Pelagićevo is a town and municipality located in Republika Srpska, an entity of Bosnia and Herzegovina. It is located in the Posavina geographical region. As of 2013, the town has a population of 2,796 inhabitants, while the municipality has 5,220 inhabitants.

It was originally named Gornji Žabar, and was later renamed after Vaso Pelagić, a representative of utopian socialism in Serbia during the second half of the nineteenth century, born in the town in 1833.

History
The municipality was created after the Dayton Agreement from part of the pre-war municipality of Gradačac (the other part of the pre-war municipality is now in the Federation of Bosnia and Herzegovina).

Demographics

Population

Ethnic composition

See also
Municipalities of Bosnia and Herzegovina

References

External links

Municipalities of Republika Srpska

Populated places in Pelagićevo
Cities and towns in Republika Srpska
Municipalities of Republika Srpska